Crown Central Petroleum, commonly known as Crown, is an American oil company that has flourished in Baltimore since the early 20th century until its recent decline due to rebranding.

History

Crown Central Petroleum Company or Crown, first began in 1917 in Harris County, Texas, when the New Crown Oil and Refining Company's Number 3 well struck oil.

In 2013 Clark Brands acquired the brand licensing business of Crown Central Petroleum.

An abandoned Crown gas station was used in the production of House Of Cards, a Netflix original series. The building, in Churchville, Maryland, is currently still standing.

Endangerment

During the summer of 2006, many stations began to disappear. All but about 20 stations were rebranded to either Texaco, Chevron Corporation, or Royal Dutch Shell gas stations. This is because the company sold these stations about two years ago, as reported in The Baltimore Sun.

As of the Spring of 2022 20 Crown stations operate in the state of Maryland.  There are four Crown branded stations operating in Baltimore, Maryland.  All four stations utilized a standard self service canopy set up featuring a brick and tan stucco design.  All four stations currently operate 24 hours a day.  The stations can be found at 4201 Erdman Ave
, 5101 York Rd, 501 E 33rd St and 4123 Frederick Ave

References

External links
 Crown Central Petroleum's Official Website

Oil companies of the United States
American companies established in 1925
1925 establishments in the United States